"Never Leave Me Alone" is a song by American singer-songwriter Nate Dogg, featuring vocals from rapper Snoop Dogg. The song is the first single released from Nate Dogg's debut studio album G-Funk Classics, Vol. 1 & 2 (1998), and contains an interpolation of the 1972 song "Where Is the Love", written by Ralph MacDonald and William Salter, and recorded by Roberta Flack and Donny Hathaway. The song was produced by Kurupt and executive produced by Suge Knight.

Commercial performance 
"Never Leave Me Alone" debuted at number 50 on the United States Billboard Hot 100 chart dated November 9, 1996. Internationally the song peaked at number two in New Zealand Recorded Music NZ chart and has been certified platinum in the country.

Music video 

The song's official music video depicts Nate Dogg arrested and confined to prison where he tries to maintain a relationship with his wife and young son. Snoop Doggy Dogg also appears in the video during his verse. The video later served as inspiration for the music video for 50 Cent's 2003 single 21 Questions, which featured Nate Dogg.

Track listing 
CD Single
Never Leave Me Alone (Radio Edit) (featuring Snoop Doggy Dogg) – 4:57
Never Leave Me Alone (Instrumental) – 5:40

12-inch single
Never Leave Me Alone (Radio Edit) (featuring Snoop Doggy Dogg) – 4:57
Never Leave Me Alone (Instrumental) – 5:40
Never Leave Me Alone (LP Version) (featuring Snoop Doggy Dogg) – 5:50

Charts

Weekly charts

Year-end charts

Certifications

References

1996 singles
Snoop Dogg songs
Nate Dogg songs
Songs written by Snoop Dogg
Songs written by Nate Dogg
Interscope Records singles
1996 songs
Songs written by Ralph MacDonald